Midnight Club: Street Racing is a racing video game developed by Angel Studios and published by Rockstar Games. The game focuses on competitive street racing and the import scene. The game was released for the PlayStation 2 and Game Boy Advance platforms, the former being a launch title for the platform. It is the first game in Midnight Club franchise, followed by Midnight Club II.

The PlayStation 2 version received "generally favorable reviews", while the Game Boy Advance version received "mixed" reviews, according to the review aggregation website Metacritic. Estimated sales of the game were 1.5 million units, with series sales reaching 2.5 million.

Gameplay

Midnight Club: Street Racing is a racing video game that focuses on the import scene and illegal street racing. Players can explore the open world or race in organized street races. A career mode has the player working their way up in the street racing world, defeating named opponents in various races, ultimately resulting in pink slip races to win the opponent's car. The game features 17 cars for the player to win throughout the career mode, ranging from taxi cabs, buses and other city vehicles to fictional representations of vehicles resembling famous Toyota, Nissan and Honda tuner vehicles.

Arcade mode allows players to compete in various game mode challenges, and to play in two player split-screen multiplayer. This features four modes: Capture the Flag, Cruise, Head to Head, and Waypoint. Players can again compete for pink slips from various racers. Each named racer has three variants of the same car, and the player earns these with successive wins. Each new version of the car is an improved version of the previous car. Environments have many destructible objects such as trees, bushes, lampposts and trash cans. Each locale features police cars that will attempt to arrest the player based on their illegal actions.

Along with Turbo Esprit and Midtown Madness, the game pioneered the use of an open world environment design instead of predefined circuit tracks. Two locales are available to players, New York City and London. Each city contains landmarks from their respective real life counterparts. Some of London's visible landmarks include Trafalgar Square, the Palace of Westminster and its Big Ben, and the Tower Bridge. New York includes such landmarks as Times Square, the Empire State Building, the World Trade Center, Rockefeller Center, United Nations Plaza, Plaza Hotel, Madison Square Garden, Washington Square Park, the Wall Street Bull, Battery Park and Central Park.

Plot
A mysterious group of urban street racers known as the Midnight Club race for pride, power, and glory in sleekly customized, enhanced sports cars. As a regular New York City cab driver, the player learns about this secret club and decides to join.

The player begins with a relatively unmodified and slow vehicle, that being the Taxi. Through a series of races, each with different goals, they defeat other racers and win faster and more expensive vehicles. The goal is to defeat the world champion, who is revealed to be a young Japanese woman named Anika whose father manufactures concept cars in Japan. Being the only person to beat her in a race, the player is the only one who sees her identity and become the World Champion of the Midnight Club, along with winning her concept car. Anika returns to Japan afterwards.

Development and release
Midnight Club was unveiled on January 27, 2000 in a press release. The PlayStation 2 version was developed by Angel Studios and published by Rockstar Games. The Gameboy Advance version was developed by Rebellion Developments and published by Destination Software. They were released on October 26, 2000 and November 14, 2001, respectively. As part of promoting the game Rocstar Games received permission from the City of New York to shut down Times Square in order to photograph promotional material and box art for Midnight Club.

The game's soundtrack features house and techno artists Derrick May and Surgeon and drum 'n' bass band Dom & Roland. "Their passion for creating superior music versus conforming to the industry standard is what makes them and their music truly unique" said Terry Donovan, COO of Rockstar Games, who further stated the music represents the "dark motivation of the members of the Midnight Club." Gameplay is locked to 30 frames per second.

Reception

The PlayStation 2 version received "generally favorable reviews", while the Game Boy Advance version received "mixed" reviews, according to the review aggregation website Metacritic. In December 2000 it ranked fifth in total PlayStation 2 game sales. In February 2001 the game placed ninth in overall sales. By July 2006, the PlayStation 2 version sold 1.5 million units and earned $43 million in the U.S. NextGen ranked it as the 32nd highest-selling game launched for the PlayStation 2, Xbox or GameCube between January 2000 and July 2006 in that country. Combined sales of Midnight Club console releases reached 2.5 million units in the U.S. by the latter date. The PS2 version was a runner-up for GameSpots annual "Best Driving Game" and "Best Game No One Played" awards, which went to Test Drive Le Mans and Samba de Amigo. The game won the award for "Racing Game of 2000" in both Editors' Choice and Readers' Choice at IGNs Best of 2000 Awards for PS2.

Douglass C. Perry of IGN wrote of the PS2 version: "In addition to the litany of cars, the huge cities are riddled with secrets and original ways to make shortcuts, which makes single player gameplay and two-player games extremely fun." Jeff Gerstmann of GameSpot called it "an extremely fun arcade-style racer." Shawn Sanders of GameRevolution, however, said, "While offering a decent helping of fun, the bland textures and ubiquitous gameplay make for a somewhat unexciting PS2 start." Kevin Rice of NextGen called it "An incredibly addictive arcade racer with excellent graphics and a rock-solid framerate. Oh, and you can hit pedestrians (by accident, of course). What's not to like?" 

For the GBA version, Nintendo Power called it "a decent if not repetitive drive." Skyler Miller of Allgame felt Midnight Clubs GBA version was "a slow, confusing version of Grand Theft Auto minus the crime and the fun." IGN's Craig Harris noted that the top-down perspective, while efficient use of the GameBoy Advance's limited resources, made gameplay difficult. However due to this perspective he noted that players will "never know where the track is going." He felt this design choice forced trial-and-error gameplay and was very frustrating for players. Harris gave poor marks for the very basic AI drivers. Lastly, he criticized the password save system, with particular emphasis on the fact that if a player does not write down the password while on screen there is no way to recover that password, effectively causing players to lose progress.

Notes

References

External links
Midnight Club official website

 

Midnight Club games
2000 video games
PlayStation 2 games
PlayStation Network games
Game Boy Advance games
Open-world video games
Rockstar Games games
Rebellion Developments games
Video games about taxis
Video games scored by Mark Cooksey
Video games developed in the United Kingdom
Video games developed in the United States
Video games set in London
Video games set in New York City
Take-Two Interactive games
Destination Software games
Street racing video games